Jan Nicolaas Frylinck (born 6 April 1994) is a South African-born Namibian cricketer who currently plays for Namibia national cricket team. He is a left-handed batsman and left-arm medium-fast bowler. Frylinck made his first-class debut for Boland on 24 March 2011 against Western Province.

Biography
Frylinck represented the South Africa Under-19 cricket team in several youth One Day International matches. He was included in the Griqualand West cricket team squad for the 2015 Africa T20 Cup.

Frylinck is a Namibian citizen by descent, his father being born in Walvis Bay. He was named in Namibia's squad for an Intercontinental Cup game against Papua New Guinea in October 2016, but had to withdraw due to not receiving confirmation of his eligibility in time. He was the leading run-scorer in the 2017–18 CSA Provincial One-Day Challenge tournament for Namibia, with 367 runs in eight matches. He was also the leading wicket-taker in the tournament for Namibia, with 16 dismissals in eight matches. In January 2018, he was named in Namibia's squad for the 2018 ICC World Cricket League Division Two tournament.

In August 2018, Frylinck was named in Namibia's squad for the 2018 Africa T20 Cup. In October 2018, he was named as the captain of Namibia's squad for the Southern sub region group for the 2018–19 ICC World Twenty20 Africa Qualifier tournament in Botswana.

In March 2019, he was named as the vice-captain of Namibia's squad for the 2019 ICC World Cricket League Division Two tournament. Namibia finished in the top four places in the tournament, therefore gaining One Day International (ODI) status. Frylinck made his ODI debut for Namibia on 27 April 2019, against Oman, in the tournament's final. In the match, he became the first bowler for Namibia to take a five-wicket haul on debut in an ODI, finishing with five wickets for thirteen runs from eight overs. He was the leading wicket-taker for Namibia in the tournament, with 14 dismissals in six matches.

In May 2019, he was named in Namibia's squad for the Regional Finals of the 2018–19 ICC T20 World Cup Africa Qualifier tournament in Uganda. He made his Twenty20 International (T20I) debut for Namibia against Ghana on 20 May 2019.

In June 2019, he was one of twenty-five cricketers to be named in Cricket Namibia's Elite Men's Squad ahead of the 2019–20 international season. In September 2019, he was named in Namibia's squad for the 2019 ICC T20 World Cup Qualifier tournament in the United Arab Emirates. In September 2021, Frylinck was named in Namibia's squad for the 2021 ICC Men's T20 World Cup. The following month, in the opening match of the 2021 Summer T20 Bash tournament, Frylinck took his first five-wicket haul in T20I cricket.

References

External links
Jan Frylinck profile at CricketArchive
 

1994 births
Living people
Boland cricketers
Cricketers from Bellville, South Africa
Cricketers who have taken five wickets on One Day International debut
Griqualand West cricketers
Namibia One Day International cricketers
Namibia Twenty20 International cricketers
Namibian cricketers
South African cricketers